The 1985 Campeonato Brasileiro Série A was the 29th edition of the Campeonato Brasileiro Série A. Coritiba won the championship for the first time, beating Bangu in the finals; both qualified for the 1986 Copa Libertadores.

This season bears the bizarre distinction of being one of the few seasons in recorded top-level professional worldwide football history in which a team won the national championship outright while scoring fewer goals than it allowed. Coritiba managed to win the title despite finishing with a negative overall goal differential. Another example is the 1986 K League, another split phase competition where the team that won a phase performed badly in another, before winning a finals knock out competition to win the championship.

Uberlândia finished with a goal differential of zero, but ended in 37th place.

Format

There was a first phase (which consisted of two rounds), a second phase, a semifinal, and a final. During the first two phases, a win counted as two points while a draw counted as one, as was common at the time.

First phase, Groups A and B 20 clubs, selected from past championship records, divided into two groups of 10, with each club playing only the clubs of the other group. There were two rounds played. The winner of each group in each round would qualify (four teams in all). In addition, the two teams in each group with the best overall points from both rounds added together would qualify for the second phase. Therefore, a total of eight teams would qualify from Groups A and B.

First phase, Groups C and D 24 clubs, 22 selected from their records in the 1984 state championships, plus the finalists of the 1984 Série B, divided into two groups of 12, playing in two rounds, with each club playing only the clubs of their own group. Again, two full rounds were played. The winner of each round in each group would qualify (four teams in all). In addition, the two teams in each group with the best overall points from both rounds added together would qualify for the second phase. Therefore, a total of eight teams would qualify from Groups C and D.

Second phase The 16 qualified teams of the first phase were placed into four mini-leagues (or groups) with four teams each. The teams played each other twice inside their own mini-league, and the winners of each mini-league qualified to the semifinals.

Semifinal The four qualified teams were placed into two brackets of two teams with the teams in each bracket playing twice (home and away), and the winners, decided on aggregate score, qualified to the finals.

Finals Played by the two qualified teams, in a single match, at the stadium of the finalist with the best record throughout the championship. In case of a draw in normal time, a penalty shootout would be used to determine the champions.

First phase

First round

Group A

Group B

Group C

Group D

Second round

Group A

Group B

Group C

Group D

Overall, aggregated results from the first phase

Group A

Group B

Group C

Group D

Second phase

Group E

Group F

Group G

Group H

Semifinals

Finals

Final standings

References
Campeonato Brasileiro Série A 1985 at RSSSF

1985
1
Brazil
B